Dax Xenos Jones (born August 4, 1970) is a former Major League Baseball player for the San Francisco Giants. He was drafted by the Giants in the 8th round (220th pick overall) of the 1990 amateur draft. In 1996, his only year in the majors, he hit .172 (10 for 58) with one home run (inside the park), two triples, and two stolen bases. He was a career .284 hitter in the minor leagues over 8 years. His highest batting average in the minor leagues was .309 in Phoenix during the 1996 season. He stole 98 bases in his 8-year minor league career, his best year being 1992 when he combined for 20 between Clinton and Shreveport.

Jones' first and middle name were taken from the lead character in the 1970 film The Adventurers.

References

External links

Pura Pelota (Venezuelan Winter League)

1970 births
Living people
Baseball players from Pittsburgh
Clinton Giants players
Creighton Bluejays baseball players
African-American baseball players
Everett Giants players
Major League Baseball center fielders
New Orleans Zephyrs players
Pastora de Occidente players
Phoenix Firebirds players
San Francisco Giants players
Shreveport Captains players
Valley Vipers players
American expatriate baseball players in Venezuela
Baseball players from Illinois
Sportspeople from Waukegan, Illinois